This is a list of public schools in Montgomery County. There are over 100 elementary, middle and high schools. As of the 2006-2007 school year, the district had 9,444 teachers that served 137,798 students at 199 schools.

Elementary schools
Arcola Elementary School
Ashburton Elementary School
Bannockburn Elementary School
Lucy V. Barnsley Elementary School
Bayard Rustin Elementary School
Beall Elementary School
Bel Pre Elementary School
Bells Mill Elementary School
Belmont Elementary School
Bethesda Elementary School
Beverly Farms Elementary School
Bradley Hills Elementary School
Broad Acres Elementary School
Brooke Grove Elementary School
Brookhaven Elementary School
Brown Station Elementary School
Burning Tree Elementary School
Burnt Mills Elementary School
Burtonsville Elementary School
Candlewood Elementary School
Cannon Road Elementary School
Carderock Springs Elementary School
Rachel Carson Elementary School
Cashell Elementary School
Cedar Grove Elementary School
Chevy Chase Elementary School
Clarksburg Elementary School
Clearspring Elementary School
Clopper Mill Elementary School
Cloverly Elementary School
Cold Spring Elementary School
College Gardens Elementary School
Cresthaven Elementary School
Capt. James Daly Elementary School
Damascus Elementary School
Darnestown Elementary School
Diamond Elementary School
Dr. Charles Drew Elementary School
DuFief Elementary School
East Silver Spring Elementary School
Fairland Elementary School
Fallsmead Elementary School
Farmland Elementary School
Fields Road Elementary School
Flora M. Singer Elementary School
Flower Hill Elementary School
Flower Valley Elementary School
Forest Knolls Elementary School
Fox Chapel Elementary School
Gaithersburg Elementary School
Galway Elementary School
Garrett Park Elementary School
Georgian Forest Elementary School
Germantown Elementary School
Glen Haven Elementary School
Glenallan Elementary School
Goshen Elementary School
Great Seneca Creek Elementary School
Greencastle Elementary School
Greenwood Elementary School
Harmony Hills Elementary School
Highland Elementary School
Highland View Elementary School
Jackson Road Elementary School
Jones Lane Elementary School
Kemp Mill Elementary School
Kensington Parkwood Elementary School
Lake Seneca Elementary School
Lakewood Elementary School
Laytonsville Elementary School
Little Bennett Elementary School
Luxmanor Elementary School
Thurgood Marshall Elementary School
Maryvale Elementary School
Spark M. Matsunaga Elementary School
S. Christa McAuliffe Elementary School
Ronald McNair Elementary School
Meadow Hall Elementary School
Mill Creek Towne Elementary School
Monocacy Elementary School
Montgomery Knolls Elementary School
New Hampshire Estates Elementary School
Roscoe Nix Elementary School
North Chevy Chase Elementary School
Oak View Elementary School
Oakland Terrace Elementary School
Olney Elementary School
William Tyler Page Elementary School
Pine Crest Elementary School
Piney Branch Elementary School
Poolesville Elementary School
Potomac Elementary School
Judith A. Resnik Elementary School
Dr. Sally K. Ride Elementary School
Ritchie Park Elementary School
Rock Creek Forest Elementary School
Rock Creek Valley Elementary School
Rock View Elementary School
Lois P. Rockwell Elementary School
Rolling Terrace Elementary School
Rosemary Hills Elementary School
Rosemont Elementary School
Sequoyah Elementary School
Seven Locks Elementary School
Sherwood Elementary School
Sargent Shriver Elementary School
Sligo Creek Elementary School
Somerset Elementary School
South Lake Elementary School
Stedwick Elementary School
Stone Mill Elementary School
Stonegate Elementary School
Strathmore Elementary School
Strawberry Knoll Elementary School
Summit Hall Elementary School
Takoma Park Elementary School
Travilah Elementary School
Twinbrook Elementary School
Viers Mill Elementary School
Washington Grove Elementary School
Waters Landing Elementary School
Watkins Mill Elementary School
Wayside Elementary School
Weller Road Elementary School
Westbrook Elementary School
Westover Elementary School
Wheaton Woods Elementary School
Whetstone Elementary School
Wood Acres Elementary School
Woodfield Elementary School
Woodlin Elementary School
Wyngate Elementary School

Middle schools

High schools

Special schools
Outdoor Education Team
Caithness Shelter Home
Emory Grove Center
Fleet Street
Glenmont
Hadley Farms
Karma Academy
Kingsley Wilderness Project
Phoenix at Emory Grove Center
Randolph Academy
Stephen Knolls School
Longview School
RICA - John L. Gildner Regional Institute for Children and Adolescents
Rock Terrace School
Carl Sandburg Learning Center
Mark Twain School

Magnet schools
Magnet schools are schools that have a specialization, such as; IT, the arts, and engineering. The curriculum is harder and teaches work that is above grade level.

Parkland Magnet Middle School
Silver Spring International Middle School
Argyle Magnet Middle School
Loiederman Magnet Middle School
Albert Einstein High School
Montgomery Blair High School
Wheaton High School
Northwood High School
Poolesville High School
Richard Montgomery High School

See also

Montgomery County Public Schools

External links

Montgomery County